The "Hightstown" rail accident occurred on the Camden and Amboy Railroad between Hightstown, New Jersey and Spotswood on 8 November 1833, just two months after horses were replaced by steam locomotives on the line. It is the earliest recorded train accident involving the death of passengers in America.

All but one of the 24 passengers it carried were injured; one was killed outright and another died later from his injuries. Among the injured was Cornelius Vanderbilt, who broke a leg and vowed never to travel by train again, although he later broke his vow and eventually became a railway magnate, owning the New York Central Railroad, among others. Another passenger was Congressman and former US President John Quincy Adams, who escaped injury, but described the accident in his diary as "the most dreadful catastrophe that ever my eyes beheld". Irish actor Tyrone Power was also aboard the train and recorded the accident in his two-volume journal Impressions of America.

Similar accidents 
Over 100 years later in 1943, a broken axle caused by an overheated journal box caused a far greater loss of life when the Congressional Limited crashed in Philadelphia.

References

External links 
Eyewitness account of accident by Tyrone Power
John Quincy Adams diary 39, 1 December 1832 – 31 May 1835, page 178 (for a transcription see here)

1833 in New Jersey
John Quincy Adams
Mercer County, New Jersey
Railway accidents in 1833
Railway accidents and incidents in New Jersey
Derailments in the United States
Accidents and incidents involving Camden and Amboy Railroad
November 1833 events